Anastácio Cahango (born 3 June 1937 in Camabatela) is an Angolan clergyman and auxiliary bishop for Luanda. He is affiliated with the Order of Friars Minor Capuchin, and became ordained in 1977. Pope John Paul II appointed him bishop in 1998. In 2013, Pope Francis accepted Cahango's resignation due to old age.

References

20th-century Roman Catholic bishops in Angola
1937 births
Living people
21st-century Roman Catholic bishops in Angola
Roman Catholic bishops of Luanda